This is the chronological list of horror films produced in Malayalam cinema.

Bhargavi Nilayam, released in December 1964, is considered as the first true horror film in the language. The film was scripted by writer Vaikom Muhammed Basheer based on his own short story "Neelavelicham". It was produced by T. K. Pareekutty under the banner Chandrathara Films. The film, which is now considered as a classic in Malayalam cinema, celebrated its Golden Jubilee in 2014.

Films

See also
List of Malayalam films
List of horror films

References

Malayalam
Malayalam
Horror